The State of New York vs. Derek Murphy is the first extended play by American rapper Sadat X. It was recorded in D&D Studios and released on September 19, 2000 via Dante Ross's Stimulated Records in affiliation with Loud Records. Audio production of the album was handled by Diamond D, Minnesota, Dart La, and A Kid Called Roots. It features guest appearances from the Money Boss Players, who are here credited as Hy Tymes. The EP spawned a single "Ka-Ching", which peaked at number 36 on the Hot Rap Songs. It is second solo effort of Brand Nubian's Sadat X, following his 1996's full-length Wild Cowboys LP.

Track listing

Personnel

Derek Murphy - main artist, executive producer
Joseph Kirkland - featured artist (track 1), producer (tracks: 1, 6)
Mark Richardson - featured artist & producer (tracks: 3, 5)
Eddie Cheeba - featured artist (tracks: 3, 5)
Sean Hamilton - featured artist (tracks: 3, 5)
John C. Parker - producer (track 2)
Patrick Lawrence - producer (track 4)
Dante Ross - executive producer
Mark Chen Heu - executive producer
Joe Quinde - mixing (tracks: 1, 2, 6)
James Wilson Staub - mixing (track 3)
CJ Moore - mixing (track 4)
Leo "Swift" Morris - mixing (track 5)
Brent Rollins - art direction
Big Jeff - management

Singles chart positions

References

External links

2000 EPs
Sadat X albums
Loud Records albums
Albums produced by Diamond D